Cainotherium is an extinct genus of rabbit-sized prehistoric even-toed ungulates. These herbivores lived in Europe from the Eocene until the early Miocene. The skeletal anatomy of these hare-like animals suggest they, along with other members of Cainotheriidae, belong to the artiodactyl suborder Tylopoda, together with oreodonts and modern camelids. Species had cloven hooves, similar to those of bovids or deer, although the shape and length of the limbs suggests that the living animals moved by leaping, like a rabbit. The shape of the teeth also suggests a rabbit-like diet of nibbled vegetation, while the size of the auditory bulla and shape of the brain suggest that it would have had good senses of hearing and smell.

References

Tylopoda
Oligocene even-toed ungulates
Miocene even-toed ungulates
Oligocene mammals of Europe
Fossil taxa described in 1828
Prehistoric even-toed ungulate genera
Miocene mammals of Europe